The Beggar's Deceit is a 1900 British short film directed by Cecil Hepworth.  The film is a comedy sketch shot from a static camera position, with the composition divided into thirds: on the left the beggar, in the centre the pavement and pedestrians, and to the right the road and vehicle traffic.

Synopsis
A legless beggar with a sign around his neck saying "cripple" pushes himself slowly and laboriously on a trolley along the pavement, soliciting alms from sympathetic passers-by.  A policeman gradually approaches from the distance.  Feeling suspicious, he taps the beggar on the shoulder, whereupon the beggar leaps up in a panic and runs away on his perfectly functional legs.  The policeman trips over the trolley before recovering his footing and setting off in pursuit.

References

1900 films
1900s British films
British silent short films
British black-and-white films
Films directed by Cecil Hepworth
1900 comedy films
1900 short films
British comedy short films
Silent comedy films